Gibberula veilae is a species of sea snail, a marine gastropod mollusk, in the family Cystiscidae. It is named after French politician Simone Veil.

Description
The length of the shell attains 3.1 mm.

Distribution
This marine species occurs off Guadeloupe.

References

veilae
Gastropods described in 2015